Sir Alexander Montague Stow, KCIE, OBE (13 December 1873 – 27 June 1936) was an administrator in British India. A member of the Indian Civil Service, he was Chief Commissioner of Delhi from 1926 to 1928 and a member of the Executive Council of the Governor of Punjab from 1928 to 1930.

His son Sir John Montague Stow was Governor-General of Barbados.

References 

 "Sir Alexander Snow", The Times, 29 June 1936, p. 16
 "Sir Alexander Stow", The Daily Telegraph, 30 June 1936, p. 17
 https://www.ukwhoswho.com/view/10.1093/ww/9780199540891.001.0001/ww-9780199540884-e-217725

1873 births
1936 deaths
Indian Civil Service (British India) officers
Knights Commander of the Order of the Indian Empire
Officers of the Order of the British Empire
People educated at Harrow School
Alumni of Pembroke College, Cambridge
British people in colonial India